Gerhoh may refer to:

 (d. 806), bishop of Eichstätt
Gerhoh of Fulda (d. 818), librarian and friend of Raban Maur
Gerhoh of Reichersberg (d. 1169), theologian
 (d. 1359), bishop of Chiemsee
 (1741–1787), Augustinian canon